KUAR (89.1 MHz "FM 89") is a public radio station in Little Rock, Arkansas.  It is a network affiliate of National Public Radio (NPR) and is licensed to the University of Arkansas at Little Rock.  During the day, KUAR airs NPR news, talk and information programming as well as Arkansas news and culture.  At night, the station airs jazz music.  Programming is simulcast on a translator station,  94.5 K233AD in Monticello.  KUAR's transmitter shares the tower of Channel 7 KATV, on Two Towers Road in Little Rock.

KLRE-FM (90.5 MHz "Classical 90.5") is also a public radio station in Little Rock, licensed to the University of Arkansas at Little Rock.  KLRE is a full-time classical music station, airing syndicated classical programming from Classical 24 and NPR, along with some local hosts.  KLRE's transmitter is on the campus of Metropolitan High School, off Scott Hamilton Drive.

The two stations have studios and offices on Asher Avenue in Little Rock's University District.  A full-time staff of nine people run the operation, including Interim General Manager/Program Director Nathan Vandiver, Operations Director William Wagner, News Director Michael Hibblen, and Development Director Vanessa McKuin.  The stations also offers UALR students the chance to get broadcasting experience by working part-time.  Like most public broadcasting operations, KUAR and KLRE rely on listener contributions for a large part of their operating budgets and several times each year hold on-air fund raisers.

History 
In 1972, the Little Rock School District was planning a new vocational high school and wanted to include a small FM radio station to train students in the field of broadcasting.  In February 1973, 90.5 KLRE-FM first signed on.  At first, KLRE was powered at only 3,600 watts on a 265 foot tower, so its coverage was limited to the city of Little Rock and adjacent communities.  It was on the air during school hours, 9 a.m. to 3:30 p.m., airing educational and classroom programming, largely staffed by students and teachers.

In 1977, the "Friends of KLRE" was formed to support the station, which expanded its hours, on the air from 6:30 a.m. till 10 p.m., playing classical music in the evening and, beginning in 1978, on weekends as well.  Also in 1978, the Arkansas Broadcasting Foundation was formed to take over the Federal Communications Commission (FCC) license.

In 1982, UALR received an FCC construction permit to build an additional non-commercial FM station at 89.1.  In 1983 KLRE's power was increased to its current 40,000 watts, covering Little Rock and its suburbs, adding NPR programs such as All Things Considered and A Prairie Home Companion the following year.

On September 16, 1986, KUAR began broadcasting.  It is powered at 100,000 watts, the maximum permitted by the FCC for non-grandfathered FM stations, covering most of Central Arkansas.  At first, KUAR and KLRE simulcast their programming.  But in 1988, the two stations began carrying separate shows during the day, with classical music continuing on KLRE while KUAR began airing all news and information during the daytime.

UALR and the Little Rock School District jointly owned the two stations until 1995, when UALR became the sole owner.  Both stations continued to simulcast classical programming at night until 2000, when KUAR began broadcasting jazz music from 10 p.m. until 5 a.m.

References

External links
KUAR Official Site

UAR
UAR
NPR member stations
News and talk radio stations in the United States
Radio stations established in 1986
1986 establishments in Arkansas